The CIA conducted secret operations in Cambodia and Laos for eight years as part of the conflict against Communist North Vietnam.

1954  
The National Intelligence Estimate projected relatively little Communist activity in Cambodia as Viet Minh withdraw. With outside help, the Cambodians should be able to build a security apparatus.

1959

In December 1958 Ngo Dinh NhuNgo Dinh Diem's younger brother and chief adviserbroached the idea of orchestrating a coup to overthrow Cambodian leader Norodom Sihanouk. Nhu contacted Dap Chhuon, Sihanouk's Interior Minister, who was known for his pro-American sympathies, to prepare for the coup against his boss. Chhuon received covert financial and military assistance from Thailand, South Vietnam, and the CIA. In January 1959 Sihanouk learned of the coup plans through intermediaries who were in contact with Chhuon. The following month, Sihanouk sent the army to capture Chhuon, who was summarily executed as soon as he was captured, effectively ending the coup attempt. Sihanouk then accused South Vietnam and the U.S. of orchestrating the coup attempt. Six months later, on 31August 1959, a small packaged lacquer gift, which was fitted with a parcel bomb, was delivered to the royal palace. Norodom Vakrivan, the chief of protocol, was killed instantly when he opened the package. Sihanouk's parents, Suramarit and Kossamak, who were sitting in another room not far from Vakrivan, narrowly escaped unscathed. An investigation traced the origin of the parcel bomb to an American military base in Saigon. While Sihanouk publicly accused Ngo Dinh Nhu of masterminding the bomb attack, he secretly suspected that the U.S. was also involved. The incident deepened his distrust of the U.S.

1969
President Richard Nixon asked Assistant to the President for National Security Affairs Henry A. Kissinger to explore two potential CIA actions in Cambodia:
Creating covert paramilitary harassing operations directed against North Vietnamese Regular Forces in the sanctuary areas just over the Cambodian border
CIA capability for eliminating or reducing the arms traffic through Cambodia to communist forces in South Vietnam.
After discussion in the 303 Committee, which was then the approval group for US covert actions, the committee endorsed the first, although the CIA recommended against it for two reasons. They believed it would take effort away from operations in South Vietnam, and also would have questionable effectiveness but high cost against the large North Vietnamese forces in Cambodia.

As far as the second,  CIA has identified a number of Cambodian army officers who are actively involved in supporting communist forces in South Vietnam, but does not now have direct, secure and controlled access to any of these officers. They doubt any of the officers involved in the arms traffic would be now susceptible to bribery both because of the profits accruing to them from such operations as well as the personal political risks entailed in a relationship involving the United States. Further, they pointed out that if recent U.S. diplomatic approaches to Cambodia result in the formal resumption of full diplomatic relations, CIA will gain an operating base for improved intelligence collection and covert action. With such a base, they would have a better chance to convince Prince Sihanouk that it is in his best interest to make an honest effort to reduce or halt the arms traffic.

Kissinger recommended continuing to monitor rather than taking action. There is no record on file of a Presidential decision on these matters.

1969
A February 19 memorandum from Assistant to the President for National Security Affairs Henry Kissinger to President Richard Nixon proposed a bombing attack by B-52 aircraft against what was believed to be COSVN in Cambodia. In this discussion, specific CIA analysis was not discussed, but Kissinger indicated that he believed the target information to be correct:
On February 18, 1969, Mr. H.A. Kissinger, Secretary of Defense Laird, Deputy Secretary of Defense Packard, Chairman of the Joint Chiefs of Staff, General Wheeler, and Colonels Pursley and Haig met in the Secretary of Defense’s conference room and were briefed by a two-officer team from Saigon on the conduct of the proposed Arc Light strike against the reported location of COSVN Headquarters. 
Note that no intelligence personnel were present.

At an 11 October 1969 meeting with Nixon, Kissinger, United States Secretary of Defense Melvin Laird, Attorney General John Mitchell and the Joint Chiefs of Staff (i.e., no CIA personnel), several pertinent observations were made.

Chairman of the Joint Chiefs of Staff (CJCS) Earle Wheeler cited two COSVN Resolutions, with the inference that COSVN existed as an organizational entity. In the subsequent discussion of bombing options, there were no mention of COSVN's physical location.

1970

Prince Norodom Sihanouk was ousted by Lon Nol in March 1970. Sihanouk claimed in his 1973 book that the CIA engineered the coup. The overthrow followed Cambodia's constitutional process following a vote of no confidence in the country's National Assembly and most accounts emphasize the primacy of Cambodian actors in Sihanouk's removal. Historians are divided about the extent of U.S. involvement in or foreknowledge of the ouster, but an emerging consensus posits some culpability on the part of U.S. military intelligence. However, according to Ben Kiernan, "There is in fact no evidence of CIA involvement in the 1970 events".

1972
Senator Clifford P. Case sponsored a law effective December 1972 cutting off funds for CIA and private military company operations in Cambodia (see the Case–Church Amendment).

1982
In December 1978, Vietnam invaded Cambodia and overthrew the genocidal Khmer Rouge regime, ending the Cambodian genocide and installing a new government led by Khmer Rouge defectors. The Reagan administration authorized the provision of aid to a coalition called the Khmer People's National Liberation Front (KPNLF), run by Son Sann. In 1989, Vietnamese forces were withdrawn from Cambodia, after having successfully quelled the uprising by Khmer Rouge and KPNLF insurgents.

See also
CIA activities in Laos
Hughes–Ryan Amendment
Allegations of United States support for the Khmer Rouge

References

CIA activities in Asia
Political history of Cambodia
Cambodia–United States relations
Cambodia